Northern Lebanon High School is a high school in Fredericksburg, Pennsylvania. The High School serves six municipalities: Swatara Township, Union Township, Cold Spring Township, Bethel Township, East Hanover Township, and Jonestown Borough. In the 2018–2019 school year, there were 674 students grades 9th through 12th.

The building also contains the Northern Lebanon School District's middle school, grades 6, 7, and 8. The school's mascot is a Viking.

Extracurriculars
Northern Lebanon High School students have access to a variety of clubs, an honor society, multiple activities and an extensive sports program.

Sports
The District funds:

Boys
Baseball - AAA
Basketball- AAA
Bowling - AAAA
Cross Country - AA
Football - AAA
Golf - AAA
Indoor Track and Field - AAAA
Soccer - AA
Tennis - AA
Track and Field - AAA
Wrestling	- AA

Girls
Basketball - AAA
Bowling - AAAA
Cross Country - AA
Indoor Track and Field - AAA
Field Hockey - AA
Soccer (Fall) - AA
Softball - AAA
Girls' Tennis - AA
Track and Field - AAA
Volleyball - AA

Notable alumni
Amy Tran - U.S.A. Field Hockey Team
Russ Diamond - P.A. State Representative

References

Public high schools in Pennsylvania
Schools in Lebanon County, Pennsylvania
1956 establishments in Pennsylvania